The Doctor and the Girl (also known as Bodies and Souls) is a 1949 American drama film directed by Curtis Bernhardt and starring Glenn Ford, Charles Coburn, Gloria DeHaven and Janet Leigh that was inspired by the French novel Corps et Âmes by Maxence van der Meersch.

Plot
Michael Corday has recently received his medical degree, and starts an internship at Bellevue Hospital, in New York City. His father is also a doctor, and is pleased that Michael intends to specialize in neurosurgery.

Michael's sister, Mariette, is engaged to George Esmond, but Michael believes George is only interested in the family's prestige. Fabienne, Michael's youngest sister, lives alone in Greenwich Village.

At the hospital, Michael works in the emergency room under Dr. Granville, who is not impressed by Michael's gruff and compassionless treatment of his patients.

Michael admits Evelyn, a patient with a lung abscess. She works the taffy machine at a candy store, so he  calls her Taffy. She must build strength before she can withstand her surgery; during her lengthy time in hospital, Michael falls in love with her.

Michael's father has Taffy discharged behind Michael's back. When Michael confronts him, he gives Michael her address, but says he will be cut off from the family. Michael finds Taffy, and the get married; his mother and sisters have a growing fondness for Taffy, but his father remains disappointed.

Michael starts a street front medical practice, with Taffy helping to setup the office and help out. His patients like him, and Michael treats his patients with compassion.

Fabienne turns up at Michael's door, suffering major blood loss after an illegal abortion. Michael is unable to save her, and learns that their father sent her to an inadequate Doctor rather than perform the abortion himself.  In their grief, Michael and his father finally bond; Michael and Taffy continue running his private practice.

Cast

Production
Prior to The Doctor and the Girl, American films avoided discussion of abortion, which was illegal in most states. MGM convinced the Motion Picture Association of America, which enforced the Hays Code, that the topic of abortion, which was not explicitly forbidden by the Code, could be tastefully addressed in the film. While the film vaguely referred to the procedure as "an illegal operation," the precedent allowed later films to include abortion plotlines.

Reception
According to MGM records, the film earned $1,326,000 in the United States and Canada and $562,000 elsewhere, resulting in a profit of $184,000.

References

External links

1949 drama films
1949 films
Metro-Goldwyn-Mayer films
American drama films
American black-and-white films
Films directed by Curtis Bernhardt
1940s English-language films
1940s American films